Cecilia Ann Womersley (later Cecilia Jenkins) (born 27 July 1943) is an alpine skier from New Zealand.

She competed for New Zealand at the 1960 Winter Olympics at Squaw Valley, and came in 34th in the downhill, 27th in the giant slalom, and 38th in the slalom.

She is the sister of 1972 alpine skier Chris Womersley.

References 
 Black Gold by Ron Palenski (2008, 2004 New Zealand Sports Hall of Fame, Dunedin) p. 108,110

External links 
 
 

Living people
1943 births
New Zealand female alpine skiers
Olympic alpine skiers of New Zealand
Alpine skiers at the 1960 Winter Olympics